Hagnias or Agnius (Ancient Greek:  or ) was, in Greek mythology, the Siphaean father of Tiphys, who was the pilot of the ship Argo, whence Tiphys is called Agniades.

Notes

References 

 Apollodorus, The Library with an English Translation by Sir James George Frazer, F.B.A., F.R.S. in 2 Volumes, Cambridge, MA, Harvard University Press; London, William Heinemann Ltd. 1921. ISBN 0-674-99135-4. Online version at the Perseus Digital Library. Greek text available from the same website.
 The Orphic Argonautica, translated by Jason Colavito. © Copyright 2011. Online version at the Topos Text Project.

Boeotian characters in Greek mythology
Boeotian mythology